The Whakarongo Railway Station was a passenger rail station on the Palmerston North to Gisborne line, in the suburb of Whakarongo in the north of Palmerston North. The station was situated between the Terrace End Station and Ashhurst Station.

The station opened on 9 March 1891. It closed to passengers in the 1960s and was demolished in 1967 likely due to the opening of the new Palmerston North Railway Station. An adjacent goods-yard was uplifted in the 1980s, with closure to all traffic on 30 October 1983. Only a single track through the station site now remains.

History 
When, to avoid confusion with other places, the name was changed from Stoney Creek on 11 July 1890, there were variants of the new name. Whakaronga appeared in several parliamentary reports, Wahakaronga in one newspaper and Whahakamanga in another.

It had a shelter shed, a passenger platform with a cart approach and a passing loop for 16 wagons. In 1899 it was noted that there were portable hurdles and a gangway for loading stock.

A railway deviation, known as the Whakarongo Deviation, between Milson and the station was originally planned in the 1920s. Work was begun but was stopped for World War Two and the track uplifted. This deviation followed along McLeavey Drive, and now borders the Kelvin Grove Cemetery and Linklater reserve. It would have been  via the Whakarongo deviation. The deviation was estimated to cost £50,000.

The Railways Department built workers' cottages nearby to serve the yard and station.

References

External links 

 map of Whakarongo deviation
 photo of demolition in late 1980s
 photo of Whakarongo Station site in April 1998

Defunct railway stations in New Zealand
Rail transport in Manawatū-Whanganui
Buildings and structures in Manawatū-Whanganui
Railway stations opened in 1891
Railway stations closed in 1967